This is an overview of the progression of the world track cycling record of the women's 500 m team sprint as recognised by the Union Cycliste Internationale.

500m Progression

 Record yet to be ratified

750m Progression

References

Track cycling world record progressions
Women's team sprint